The Helsinki–Turku high-speed railway or tunnin juna (one hour train), also formerly known as the ELSA-rata (Espoo-Lohja-Salo), is a proposed railway line in the planning stage to provide a more direct connection between Helsinki and Turku, Finland than the current Rantarata railway line which follows the southern coast.

History
The first examination of a direct rail link between Espoo and Salo took place in 1979. 
In 2017, the Finnish government provided €10 million in funding towards the planning and construction of the line, with half of this being eligible for European Union TEN-T funding.

In April 2018, the Finnish Transport Agency awarded planning contracts for the line to three consultants: Sitiowise Finland for the Espoo to Lohja section of track, Pöyry for the Lohja to Suomusjärvi section, and Ramboll for the Suomusjärvi to Salo section. After the 2019 Finnish parliamentary election, new Prime Minister of Finland Antti Rinne's government confirmed its commitment to advancing the three planned Finnish high-speed rail lines: the ELSA-rata, a Helsinki-Tampere line, and the Itärata line from Helsinki to Eastern Finland.

In September 2019, the Ministry of Economic Affairs and Employment gave authorisation to the Ministry of Transport and Communications to establish the Turku One Hour Train Project Company to oversee the Helsinki–Turku high-speed rail line, and the Suomirata Project Company, which will manage development of the new Riihimäki–Tampere line.

Following the Finnish government's request for investment in February 2020, the EU's Connecting Europe Facility approved €37.5 million in funding for the Helsinki–Turku high-speed rail project in July 2020, to form an integral part of the Trans-European Transport Network's Helsinki–Valletta Corridor.

Route
The line is planned to branch from the Rantarata after Espoo railway station, connecting to Salo following the Finnish national road 1 corridor, through the municipalities of Vihti and Lohja. To complement the line and increase capacity, the track between Leppävaara and Espoo will be quadrupled as part of the Helsinki commuter rail services. Stations on the line are yet to be confirmed, although Lohja is expected to gain a station, being one of the largest Finnish municipalities without scheduled railway services.

Objections
In July 2019, residents of the Lukkarinmäki area of Salo have gathered a petition of 2,500 signatures against building the line through their neighbourhood, due to the potential need to demolish some properties. Alternatives proposed include building the line to avoid the neighbourhood or building a tunnel.

Benefits
By reducing the journey time to 75 minutes between Helsinki and Turku, along with new stations in Vihti and Lohja, a further 1.6 million passengers are expected annually. Capacity will also be freed on the existing Rantarata railway line following the coast.

Costs
The total construction cost of the ELSA-rata was estimated at €1.5 billion as of 2016, with planning costs of €40 million. In 2019 it was reported that the expected cost had increased to €2 billion.

See also
 High-speed rail in Finland
 List of railway lines in Finland
 Rail transport in Finland
 Rantarata

References

External links
 Tunnin juna (in Finnish)

Railway lines in Finland
Proposed railway lines in Finland
5 ft gauge railways in Finland
2031 in rail transport